Jennifer 'Jay' S. Newton-Small is co-founder and chief executive officer at MemoryWell and a long-serving Washington correspondent for TIME Magazine and a journalist for Bloomberg News.  She is author of Broad Influence: How Women Are Changing the Way America Works, more than half a dozen Time magazine cover stories, and numerous articles on Washington politics, foreign policy, and national trends, and as a Halcyon House fellow is writing a book about caregiving.

Newton-Small was an undergraduate at Tufts University in Medford, Massachusetts, and earned a Master of Science degree in Journalism from Columbia University in New York City.

Early life
Jay Newton-Small was an only child born to Sue S. (Tang) Newton-Small, an international lawyer who had been born in Hong Kong as Sok Chun ("Spring Flower") Tang on December 13, 1948, and who fluently spoke Cantonese, and Graham 'Gray' Newton-Small, an Australian economist whose Alzheimer's disease later inspired her to begin MemoryWell. Both of her parents were United Nations diplomats who traveled and reared Jay overseas, outside the United States. They had met in Zambia while both traveled the world for the United Nations and continue to do so thereafter.  They were married for forty years and retired to Naples, Florida.  Her mother, Sue S. (Tang) Newton-Small, was a passionate Republican fundraiser and socialite who loved George W. Bush and disliked Barack Obama.

Formal education
 Deerfield Academy, high school diploma
 Tufts University, B.S. in International Relations, B.S. in Art History 
 Columbia University Graduate School of Journalism, 2000–2001, Master of Science in Journalism

Journalistic career
 AFP (Agence France-Presse) – 2002–2003
 Reporter, Bloomberg News – 2003–2007 – Covered the White House and US politics
 Washington Correspondent, Congressional Correspondent, Time Magazine – 2007–present.  She covered politics as well as stories on five continents from conflicts in the Middle East to the earthquake in Haiti and the November 2015 terror attacks in Paris. She has written more than half a dozen TIME cover stories and interviewed heads of state, including Barack Obama and George W. Bush during their Presidencies, foreign dignitaries, senators, state governors, and other elected officials.

MemoryWell
Newton-Small's father died with Alzheimer's disease.  After several years of incubating the ideas, she cofounded in 2016—with Denver Nicks, and Steve Gettinger—MemoryWell, a network of professional journalists who write and retell the life stories of those suffering from Alzheimer's and other dementias, supporting their caregivers and preserving memories of the lives who forgot how to remember.  She and Denver Nicks were staff writers at TIME magazine and graduates of the Columbia University Graduate School of Journalism.  Steve Gettinger reminisced personal about his mother in "The Zen of Alzheimer's" for The New York Times Magazine. One of MemoryWell's goals is to extend the memory in others of those whose memory has failed by developing professionally written profiles of persons with a dementia.  In February 2017, Newton-Small began a six-month live-in residency at Halcyon House Located in the heart of the Georgetown section of in Washington, D.C., where start-ups can develop their business strategy.

MemoryWell's website and the Halcyon profile for Newton-Small claim that its stories help assisted living caregivers build empathy and get to know and engage in a more deeply personal way with their residents.

Personal life

Ms. Newton-Small lives in Santa Fe, New Mexico.

Awards
 2017 – Halcyon Incubator Fellow, Halcyon House
 2016–2017 – New America Fellow, to explore Alzheimer's disease and end of life care through a book she is writing about her father's diagnosis and treatment.
 2016 – Everett McKinley Dirksen Award for Distinguished Reporting of Congress, for article in Elle. "Newton-Small's reporting shows that personal relationships can help dissolve the rancor in Congress and break the gridlock."
 2016 – Deadline Club award for community service reporting, awarded to Don Von Drehle, Jay Newton-Small, and Maya Rhodan, "What It Takes to Forgive a Killer" in TIME Magazine
 2015 – Harvard Institute of Politics fellow

References

External links

1975 births
Living people
American political journalists
American women journalists
American people of Chinese descent
Alzheimer's disease researchers
Time (magazine) people
Bloomberg L.P. people
Harvard Fellows
Tufts University alumni
Columbia University Graduate School of Journalism alumni
Deerfield Academy alumni
21st-century American women